Samson Chiu Leung-chun is a Hong Kong-based film director, film writer and newspaper columnist. He is a member of the Hong Kong Directors' Guild.

Filmography
 News Attack (1989) - director/writer, starring Andy Lau as a news photographer
 Rose (1992) - director, Maggie Cheung and Roy Cheung
 Yesteryou, Yesterme, Yesterday (1993) - director
 New Age of Living Together (1994) - director/writer
 Lost Boys in Wonderland (1995) - director/writer
 What a Wonderful World (1996) - starring Andy Lau
 When I Fall in Love... with Both (2000) - starring Fann Wong and Michelle Reis
 Golden Chicken (2002) - director/writer, starring Sandra Ng as a prostitute
 Golden Chicken 2 (2003) - director
 McDull, The Alumni (2006) - director

See also
 Cinema of Hong Kong

External links
 
 HK cinemagic entry
 loveHKfilm entry

Hong Kong film directors
Living people
Year of birth missing (living people)